

George Wenman (27 October 1805 – 19 January 1837) was an English cricketer who played first-class cricket from 1825 to 1834.

Wenman was born at Benenden in Kent in 1805, the son of John and Elizabeth Wenman (née Gude), and was a member of the Wenman family, a number of whom played cricket; his older brother John Wenman and cousins Charles and Ned Wenman all played for Kent sides in the early 19th century. Wenman is known to have played village cricket for Benenden, at that point one of the best sides in England, from 1822; a number of family members, including his uncle, also played for the side. As well as his home village, Wenman played village cricket for Hawkhurst, another strong club side, and Leeds.

Wenman made his first-class debut in June 1825 for a Kent XI against a Sussex side on Hawkhurst Moor. He played in a total of nine first-class matches, including five for Kent, making his final appearances in 1834 when he played twice for Kent against England sides, once for an England XI against Sussex, and once for the Players against the Gentlemen. In his nine first-class matches he scored a total of 66 runs, with a highest score of 19 not out made against Sussex 1829.

Professionally Wenman was a grocer and linen draper at Brookland, Kent. He died there in 1837 aged 31 and is buried at Benenden.

Notes

References

Bibliography
Carlaw D (2020) Kent County Cricketers A to Z. Part One: 1806–1914 (revised edition). (Available online at the Association of Cricket Statisticians and Historians. Retrieved 2020-12-21.)
Birley D (1999) A Social History of English Cricket. London: Aurum Press. 
Haygarth A (1862a) Scores and Biographies, vol. 1 (1744–1826). London: Longman.
Haygarth A (1862b) Scores and Biographies, vol. 2 (1827–1840). London: Longman.
Milton H (1983) Kent Cricketers 1834–1983. Nottingham: The Association of Cricket Statisticians and Historians
Milton H (1992) Cricket Grounds of Kent. Nottingham: The Association of Cricket Statisticians and Historians. (Available online. Retrieved 2022-04-04.)
Moore D (1988) The History of Kent County Cricket Club. London: Christopher Helm.

External links

1805 births
1837 deaths
English cricketers
English cricketers of 1787 to 1825
English cricketers of 1826 to 1863
Kent cricketers
Left-Handed v Right-Handed cricketers
Players cricketers
People from Benenden